Deephaven is a small city in Hennepin County, Minnesota, United States. The community is located on Lake Minnetonka. The community’s center is the historic Cottagewood General Store, which has been serving the Lake Minnetonka area since 1895. The population was 3,642 as of the 2010 Census, down from 3,853 as of the 2000 census.

History

Deephaven was settled in 1876 by Saint Louis attorney Charles Gibson. Gibson built a summer house in an area known as "Northome" and began promoting the area as a vacation destination for Southerners. In 1879 he advocated for the construction of the 150-room Hotel Saint Louis, the area's first grand hotel. The community was connected to the Minneapolis and Saint Louis Railway to serve both the hotel and local cottagers.

The Minnetonka Yacht Club was founded in Deephaven in 1882 and incorporated in 1889. One of the club's co-founders, Hazen Burton, built a home named "Chimo" in Deephaven in 1890. A train depot was built near the property so that the Burtons could commute to their department store in Minneapolis. The name "Deephaven" can be traced back to the name of this depot.

In 1893 Burton commissioned local boat builder Arthur Dyer to develop a new kind of sailboat called a racing scow. When the Onawa debuted in 1893, it was disqualified for winning nearly every regatta it entered. The rules were eventually modified, however, and racing scows became popular within the sailing community worldwide. The Onawa is currently displayed at the Excelsior-Lake Minnetonka Historical Society Museum in nearby Excelsior.

Lake Minnetonka fell out of favor as a vacation destination in the 1890s. The Hotel Saint Louis suffered financially and was eventually demolished in 1907. In its place, Walter Donald Douglas of the Quaker Oats fortune and his wife Mahala built a twenty-seven room estate named "Walden." Walter Douglas perished in the Titanic disaster in 1912, however, Mahala and her French maid Berthe Leroy were survivors. Mahala returned to Deephaven as a widow and lived there until her death in 1945.

Deephaven's historic Cottagewood General Store, opened in 1895 by Ralph M. Chapman, served as a grocer to tourists along the shores of Lake Minnetonka. The store is one of Deephaven's most notable attractions today.

Geography
Minnetonka Boulevard serves as a main route.

Demographics

2010 census
As of the census of 2010, there were 3,642 people, 1,337 households, and 1,058 families living in the city. The racial makeup of the city was 97.6% White, 0.4% African American, 0.1% Native American, 0.9% Asian, 0.3% from other races, and 0.7% from two or more races. Hispanic or Latino of any race were 1.1% of the population.

There were 1,337 households, of which 38.8% had children under the age of 18 living with them, 71.3% were married couples living together, 5.5% had a female householder with no husband present, 2.4% had a male householder with no wife present, and 20.9% were non-families. 17.4% of all households were made up of individuals, and 7.4% had someone living alone who was 65 years of age or older. The average household size was 2.71 and the average family size was 3.08.

The median age in the city was 46.1 years. 27.5% of residents were under the age of 18; 4.7% were between the ages of 18 and 24; 16.2% were from 25 to 44; 37.5% were from 45 to 64; and 14.3% were 65 years of age or older. The gender makeup of the city was 49.7% male and 50.3% female.

2000 census
As of the census of 2000, there were 3,853 people, 1,373 households, and 1,098 families living in the city. The racial makeup of the city was 97.35% White, 0.29% African American, 0.34% Native American, 0.70% Asian, 0.05% Pacific Islander, 0.29% from other races, and 0.99% from two or more races. Hispanic or Latino of any race were 0.91% of the population.

There were 1,373 households, out of which 42.4% had children under the age of 18 living with them, 71.7% were married couples living together, 5.9% had a female householder with no husband present, and 20.0% were non-families. 16.6% of all households were made up of individuals, and 6.3% had someone living alone who was 65 years of age or older.  The average household size was 2.79 and the average family size was 3.16.

In the city, the population was spread out, with 30.5% under the age of 18, 3.7% from 18 to 24, 25.2% from 25 to 44, 29.8% from 45 to 64, and 10.8% who were 65 years of age or older.  The median age was 40 years. For every 100 females, there were 97.6 males.  For every 100 females age 18 and over, there were 94.4 males.

The median income for a household in the city was $101,278, and the median income for a family was $107,422. Males had a median income of $71,181 versus $42,297 for females. The per capita income for the city was $58,544.  About 1.0% of families and 2.6% of the population were below the poverty line, including 2.8% of those under age 18 and 3.8% of those age 65 or over.

Politics

Notable people
 Walter Donald Douglas, Titanic disaster victim
 Marisa Coughlan, actress
 Jake Gardiner, Toronto Maple Leafs defenceman
 Jeffrey Hatcher, playwright and screenwriter
 Tim Herron, professional golfer
 Max McGee, Green Bay Packers football player
 Dean Phillips, U.S. Representative, resident from 2011 until 2021
 Mike Plant, yachtsman

References

External links
 
 Deephaven, Minnesota website
 Deephaven Photograph Collection
 ePodunk: Profile for Deephaven, Minnesota, MN

Cities in Minnesota
Cities in Hennepin County, Minnesota